The women's 3000 metres races of the 2013–14 ISU Speed Skating World Cup 6, arranged in the Thialf arena, in Heerenveen, Netherlands, was held on 15 March 2014.

Annouk van der Weijden of the Netherlands won the race, while Yvonne Nauta of the Netherlands came second, and Olga Graf of Russia came third.

Result
The race took place on Sunday, 15 March, scheduled at 14:15.

Division A

References

Women 3000
6